Fossil fuel drilling may refer to:
 Oil well
 Offshore drilling
 Deepwater drilling
 Drilling fluid